Plaza Lafayette is a small,  park and surrounding streets in the Hudson Heights neighborhood of Washington Heights, Manhattan, New York City.  Named after the Marquis de Lafayette, the French hero of the American Revolution, the park is roughly trapezoidal in shape, and is bounded by Riverside Drive – originally called Boulevard Lafayette in this area – on the west, the westbound lane of West 181st Street – also called "Plaza Lafayette" here – on the north, the eastbound lane of West 181st Street/Plaza Lafayette on the south, and Haven Avenue on the east.  The land was acquired by the city on February 23, 1918.

The park itself has no amenities, but across what is now Riverside Drive is a small viewing area. This and the parklet itself are located near the highest natural point in Manhattan – about 5 block away in Bennett Park – and the viewing platform has unobstructed views of the George Washington Bridge, the Hudson Palisades, and the Hudson River.

The platform has stairs leading down to what is now the Henry Hudson Parkway, which was once Riverside Drive.  The staircase is now gated off, but can still be seen from the Hudson River Greenway, on the other side of the parkway, which is reachable by a pedestrian bridge about a block north of the Plaza.

Gallery

References

External links 
 

Washington Heights, Manhattan
Parks in Manhattan
Streets in Manhattan
Urban public parks